Occirhenea georgiana is a species of medium-sized predatory air-breathing land snails, carnivorous terrestrial pulmonate gastropod molluscs in the family Rhytididae. This species is endemic to Australia.

References

Rhytididae
Gastropods of Australia
Endangered fauna of Australia
Gastropods described in 1832
Taxonomy articles created by Polbot